Perpetuous Dreamer was an alias of Armin van Buuren, which is known for the song "The Sound Of Goodbye". The track, which was co-produced with Raz Nitzan, went to number one on the US dance chart. As with most early electronic music releases in the pre internet era, the use of aliases has created very confusing names for the mixes over the years of re-releasing tracks.

Discography 

The discography below aims to collect the releases by Armin van Buuren on this alias. Several other artists have also remixed the tracks but are not listed.

See also
List of number-one dance hits (United States)
List of artists who reached number one on the US Dance chart

References

Dutch dance music groups